The executive branch of Guatemala includes 14 ministries:

See also 
 Secretariats of the Presidency of Guatemala

 
Government of Guatemala